Roivant Sciences is a healthcare company focused on applying technology to drug development. Roivant builds subsidiary biotech and healthcare technology companies.

History
Vivek Ramaswamy founded Roivant Sciences in 2014. Focused on aligning incentives and improving capital efficiency, Ramaswamy's initial strategy was to in-license drug candidates and create subsidiaries focused on distinct therapeutic areas. This strategy expanded to include developing earlier stage drug candidates and platform technologies. Roivant is a parent company to over a dozen subsidiaries ranging from Immunovant, a majority-owned public company focused on autoimmune diseases, to privately held Dermavant Sciences, a commercial-stage company focused on medical dermatology.

Roivant also develops healthcare technologies through investments in Datavant, which helps healthcare institutions safely share data, and Lokavant, which integrates clinical trial data to identify and mitigate risks in pharmaceutical development. As of 2019, Roivant had over forty investigational drugs in development in fourteen therapeutic areas across its family of companies. 

As of 2017, Roivant was valued at $7 billion. In 2017, it was reported that Roivant raised $1.1 billion in equity led by SoftBank Vision Fund.

At the end of 2019, Roivant formed a $3 billion partnership with Sumitomo Dainippon Pharma and transferred its ownership stake in five of its subsidiaries: Myovant Sciences, Urovant Sciences, Enzyvant Therapeutics, Altavant Sciences, and Spirovant Sciences, which now sit under Sumitovant Biopharma. The deal included the option for Sumitomo to acquire up to six additional subsidiaries.

In April 2020, Roivant dosed the first patient in a clinical study evaluating gimsilumab in COVID-19 patients for the prevention and treatment of acute respiratory distress syndrome (ARDS). Additionally, in April, Datavant announced that its technology is being used to create a pro bono COVID-19 research database to help public health and policy researchers combat the pandemic.

In January 2021, Ramaswamy stepped down as CEO. Matt Gline, previously the company's chief financial officer, became CEO. In February 2021, Roivant Sciences acquired Silicon Therapeutics, a small-molecule drug designer and computational physics platform, for $450 million in Roivant equity. In October 2021, Roivant Sciences merged with special-purpose acquisition company Montes Archimedes Acquisition Corp. to become listed on the Nasdaq.

Roivant Social Ventures (RSV) is a 501 (c)(3) charitable organization that invests in health technologies and new therapeutics that lead to systemic improvements to health equity. Launched in 2020 by leaders from Roivant Sciences, RSV partners with innovative companies, institutes and organizations to promote systemic, sustained improvements to the way health care is accessed and delivered.

Subsidiaries and former subsidiaries 
As of April 2020, the company's subsidiaries include:
Dermavant, focused on developing therapeutics in medical dermatology, with lead candidate tapinarof in development for the treatment of psoriasis and atopic dermatitis.
Genevant, created to work on RNA-based therapeutics.
Immunovant, launched in July 2018 to develop therapies for autoimmune diseases, with lead candidate IMVT-1401 being developed for the treatment of myasthenia gravis, Graves' ophthalmopathy and warm antibody autoimmune hemolytic anemia.
Lokavant, which is focused on improving clinical trial monitoring.
Sio Gene Therapies, a gene therapy company focused on developing treatments for neurodegenerative diseases. In June 2018, the company licensed worldwide rights to AXO-Lenti-PD, an investigational gene therapy for Parkinson's disease, from Oxford BioMedica. Axovant is also developing gene therapies for GM1 gangliosidoses and GM2 gangliosidoses, including Tay–Sachs disease and Sandhoff disease.
VantAI, a computational drug discovery platform.
Roivant Social Ventures, a 501(c)(3) social impact organization focused on improving healthcare access and outcomes for underserved patient populations

The following subsidiaries were previously a part of Roivant, but were included as part of a strategic transaction with Sumitomo Dainippon Pharma which closed in December 2019:

Altavant Sciences, which is developing a treatment for pulmonary arterial hypertension.
Enzyvant Therapeutics, which is focused on developing therapies for rare enzyme deficiencies.
Myovant Sciences, founded in partnership with Takeda Pharmaceutical Company to develop medicines for women's health and prostate cancer.
Spirovant, which focused on developing gene therapies for cystic fibrosis.
Urovant, which is developing lead candidate vibegron, licensed from Merck & Co.

Roivant is a major shareholder of Datavant, which was co-founded with Travis May to break down silos between healthcare datasets and connect the world's health data. In October 2020, Datavant announced it raised funds from Roivant Sciences alongside Transformation Capital, Johnson & Johnson, and Cigna.

In June 2018, Roivant laid off 67 employees and reassigned 130 to subsidiaries. In December 2019, Roivant transferred five of its subsidiaries for — Myovant, Urovant, Enzyvant, Altavant, and Spirovant, in addition to a greater than 10% share in itself — to Sumitomo Dainippon Pharma.

In March 2020, Roivant announced it is developing gimsilumab, an anti-granulocyte-macrophage colony-stimulating factor (anti-GM-CSF) monoclonal antibody to prevent and treat acute respiratory distress syndrome (ARDS) in patients with COVID-19. In April 2020, Roivant started the administration of gimsilumab to COVID-19 patients in the United States.

Funding

References

Companies listed on the Nasdaq
Pharmaceutical companies established in 2014
Life sciences industry
Multinational companies
Special-purpose acquisition companies